ALGO is an algebraic programming language developed for the Bendix G-15 computer.

ALGO was one of several programming languages inspired by the Preliminary Report on the International Algorithmic Language written in Zürich in 1958. This report underwent several modifications before becoming the Revised Report on which most ALGOL implementations are based. As a result, ALGO and other early ALGOL-related languages have a very different syntax from ALGOL 60.

Example 
Here is the Trabb Pardo – Knuth algorithm in ALGO:

TITLE TRABB PARDO-KNUTH ALGORITHM
SUBSCript I,J
DATA A(11)
FORMAt FI(2DT), FLARGE(3D)
PROCEDURE F(T=Z)
BEGIN
Z=SQRT(ABS(T))+5*T^3
END
FOR I=0(1)10
A[I]=KEYBD
FOR J=0(1)10 BEGIN
I=J-10
F(A[I]=Y)
PRINT(FI)=I
IF Y > 400
GO TO LARGE
PRINT(FL)=Y
GO TO NEXT
LARGE: PRINT(FLARGE)=999
NEXT: CARR(1) END
2END

Remarks

See also 

 ALGOL 58
 ALGOL 60

References

External links 
ALGO manual (PDF)

ALGOL 58 dialect
pito pito pito pito